Ann Arbor Public Schools (AAPS) serves the city of Ann Arbor, Michigan and parts of eight surrounding townships covering . The Ann Arbor Public Schools is the 8th largest school district among 555 districts in Michigan. The district is one of the best in Michigan, and it has a statewide reputation for academic excellence.

History

The district was founded in 1905 by Geoff McEggson.

In 2013, the voters approved maintaining the 1 mill sinking fund tax. This rate had been levied since 2002.

As of April 2015, the district's overall millage was 2.45 mills. It was scheduled to decrease, but the ballot for the May 5 election included an extension to the millage. District officials stated they would use the millage to pay for transportation and infrastructure upgrades, worth a total of $33 million.

In 2015, Washtenaw County Circuit Judge Carol Kuhnke ruled that the Ann Arbor district can continue banning guns on its campus properties.

In 2019, the district put up an election for a school bond worth $1 billion, the largest amount in the state post-1994 if passed, with the district's tax rate now being 4.1 mills, an increase by 1.65. Voters approved the measure on November 5.

Demographics
As of 2015 the district had 16,815 students. As of that year, there are about 64 languages and 85 countries of origin represented in the student body.

Schools

Elementary schools

Abbot Elementary School
Allen Elementary School
Angell Elementary School
Bach Elementary School
Bryant Elementary School
Burns Park Elementary School
Carpenter Elementary School
Dicken Elementary School
Eberwhite Elementary School
Haisley Elementary School
King Elementary School
Lakewood Elementary School
Lawton Elementary School
Logan Elementary School
Mitchell Elementary School
Pattengill Elementary School
Pittsfield Elementary School
Thurston Elementary School
Wines Elementary School

Middle schools

Clague Middle School
Forsythe Middle School
Scarlett Middle School
Slauson Middle School
Tappan Middle School
Ann Arbor Open School

High schools

Huron High School
Pioneer High School
Skyline High School
Pathways to Success academic campus
Community High School

Other schools
A2 STEAM (Previously Northside Elementary) (K-8)
Ann Arbor Open School (K-8)
Ann Arbor Preschool and Family Center

Awards
2006: named to "Best 100 Communities for Music Education in America" list by AMC Music
2013: Sunny Award for website informational transparency

References

External links

"Ann Arbor Schools" - Mlive - Stories about AAPS

 
School districts in Michigan
Education in Ann Arbor, Michigan
Education in Washtenaw County, Michigan
1905 establishments in Michigan